The Régiment d'Auvergne was a regiment of the French army during the ancien régime.

 1597 : the creation of the Régiment du Bourg de Lespinasse.
 1635 : the régiment becomes the Régiment d'Auvergne. From 1616 to 1635, the new regiments become permanent.
 1776 : The 2nd and 4th battalions become the Régiment de Gâtinais

References

Military units and formations established in the 1590s
Military units and formations disestablished in 1791
Line infantry regiments of the Ancien Régime